Faber is the self-titled EP by Canadian pop-punk band Faber Drive, released prior to their name change. Released in limited quantities, it is packaged in a black and white cardsleeve and features three tracks. The first two were eventually re-released on their debut album Seven Second Surgery in 2007. The third track, Cementhead, is only available on this release.

Track listing

Personnel
Faber: Guitar and Lead Vocals
Hinsley: Guitar
Jeremy LIddle: Bass and Backing Vocals
Red Bull: Drums

Credits
Produced by : Joey Moi & Brian Howes
Mixed by: Joey Moi at Mountain View Studios, Abbotsford, B.C.
Engineer: Joey Moi
Recorded by: Joey Moi & Brian Howes at Mountain View Studios, Abbotsford, B.C.
Additional musicians: Josh Ramsay (keys & bass), Robyn Diaz (drums)
Additional guitar for "Cementhead": Dave Genn
Mastering: Jamie Sitar

All songs written by: Dave Faber and Brian Howes
Except "Cementhead" words and music by: Blair Dobson, Dave Genn, Brad McGiveron and Rich Priske

Published by Riispafa Music Publishing
Except for "Cementhead" publishing administered by: Divine Industries on behalf of DSK

2006 debut EPs
Faber Drive albums